Tylototriton notialis, the Laos knobby newt, is a species of newt in the family Salamandridae. It is only known from its type locality in the Nakai-Nam Theun Biodiversity Conservation Area, Khammouane Province, central Laos. The type locality is an evergreen mixed deciduous–pine forest; the newts were found in and near a small stream. It is likely that Laos knobby newt will also be found in adjacent areas of Vietnam. Based on molecular genetic data, it belongs to the Tylototriton asperrimus group of knobby newts.

References 

notialis
Endemic fauna of Laos
Amphibians of Laos